Hong Seung-ki (Hangul: 홍승기; born 4 October 1984) is a South Korean badminton player. Hong educated at the Seoul Physical Education High School, and has won five national junior title since in the first grade. He was part of the national junior team that won the silver medal at the 2000 World Junior and 2002 Asian Junior Championships. Hong clinched the boys' singles title at the 2002 Dutch Junior, and was ranked 1 in the national junior at that year. He entered the Inha University, and after graduated he join the Miryang city team. Hong won his first international title at the 2003 Canada International tournament in the men's singles event. In 2009, he finished as the semi-finalists at the 2009 Singapore International Series in the men's singles and doubles event, he then took the men's singles title in Singapore in 2010.

Achievements

BWF International Challenge/Series 
Men's singles

  BWF International Challenge tournament
  BWF International Series tournament

References

External links 
 

1984 births
Living people
South Korean male badminton players
Sportspeople from Seoul
Inha University alumni